Haplochromis phytophagus is a species of cichlid endemic to Lake Victoria.  This species can reach a length of  SL.

References

External links 
http://www.cichlid-forum.com/profiles/species.php?id=1572
http://www.cichlid-forum.com/articles/x_phytophagus.php
http://www.cichlidae.com/gallery/species.php?id=44&content=bibliography&lang=de

phytophagus
Fish described in 1966
Fish of Lake Victoria
Taxonomy articles created by Polbot